Meiktila is a city in central Burma on the banks of Meiktila Lake in the Mandalay Region at the junctions of the Bagan-Taunggyi, Yangon-Mandalay and Meiktila-Myingyan highways. Because of its strategic position, Meiktila is home to Myanmar Air Force's central command and Meiktila Air Force Base. The country's main aerospace engineering university, Myanmar Aerospace Engineering University is also located in Meiktila. As of 2021, the city had a population of 177,442.

History

The name Meiktila comes from Mithila, the name of an ancient Indian kingdom.

The history of Meiktila is closely tied to that of central Myanmar's dry zone, home of the Bamar people. The region had been part of various Bamar kingdoms at least from 11th century CE to 19th century CE before the British Empire took over all of Upper Myanmar in 1885.

Meiktila was part of the 1945 Battle of Meiktila and Mandalay, during which the Allied forces under William Slim defeated the Japanese forces. Soon after Burma's independence from Britain in 1948, Meiktila briefly fell under the insurgent Karen forces.

On 22 March 2013, a state of emergency was imposed in the town after two days of anti-Muslim riots after dozens of people were killed and more than 12,000 were forced from their homes, the overwhelming majority of whom were Muslims. This violence later spread to other places in Burma such as Okpho and Gyobingauk Townships.

Geography
Meiktila district is the most easterly of the districts in Myanmar's central dry zone. It lies between Wundwin, Myingyan, Yamethin, and touches Shan State on the east. Mondai dam supplies water to the lake.

Climate 
Meiktila has a hot semi-arid climate (Köppen BSh), marginally too dry to qualify as a tropical savanna climate (Aw). There is a winter dry season (November–April) and a summer wet season (May–October); however the wet season rainfall is much lower than most of Indochina because of the rain shadow of the Arakan Mountains to the west.

Culture
The city's well-known Buddhist pagodas are Shwemyintin, Shweyinmi (asa Hteethonesint), Nagayon, Yele, Sutaung Pyi, Hpaung Daw U Pagoda and Phaungdawoo.

Education
Meiktila is home to the Myanmar Aerospace Engineering University, a national university; and regional universities and colleges such as Meiktila University, Meiktila Institute of Economics, Computer University, Meiktila, Technological University, Meiktila and Meiktila Education College.

Of the city's six public Basic Education High Schools, BEHS 1 Meiktila or Royal High School is considered the most selective.

Military

Meiktila is home to two Myanmar Air Force air bases:

 Meiktila Air Base and home to Central Command
 Shante Air Base - located north of Meiktila in Pyitharyar

References

 
Township capitals of Myanmar
Populated places in Mandalay Region